Jesse Dixon (born 20 June 1992) is an Australian former professional racing driver. He is best known for completing the 2012 Bathurst 1000 in the Shannons Supercar Showdown wildcard.

Career results

Supercars Championship results

Bathurst 1000 results

Complete Super2 Series results
(key) (Round results only)

References

 Articles on Jesse Dixion via Speedcafe.com webpage

External links
 Profile on Supercars webpage
 
 

1992 births
Formula Ford drivers
Living people
Supercars Championship drivers
Australian racing drivers